Abbottstown is a borough in Adams County, Pennsylvania, United States. The population was 1,022 at the 2020 census.

History
Abbottstown is named for John Abbott, who founded it in 1753. The John Abbott House was added to the National Register of Historic Places in 1980. The town had rail service via the East Berlin Railroad from 1877 to 1914 and 1916 to 1939. The tracks were removed in 1940.

In 1950, Abbottstown had a population of 538.

Geography
Abbottstown is located at  (39.885621, -76.986120).

Demographics

As of the census of 2000, there were 905 people, 323 households, and 254 families residing in the borough. The population density was 1,592.2 people per square mile (613.0/km2). There were 346 housing units at an average density of 608.7 per square mile (234.4/km2). The racial makeup of the borough was 95.25% White, 0.22% African American, 0.11% Native American, 0.11% Pacific Islander, 3.87% from other races, and 0.44% from two or more races. Hispanic or Latino of any race were 5.52% of the population.

There were 323 households, out of which 43.7% had children under the age of 18 living with them, 64.4% were married couples living together, 10.2% had a female householder with no husband present, and 21.1% were non-families. 15.5% of all households were made up of individuals, and 6.8% had someone living alone who was 65 years of age or older. The average household size was 2.80 and the average family size was 3.15.

In the borough the population is spread out over several age groups, with 29.5% under the age of 18, 7.6% from 18 to 24, 36.4% from 25 to 44, 18.7% from 45 to 64, and 7.8% who were 65 years of age or older. The median age was 32 years. For every 100 females there were 92.1 males. For every 100 females age 18 and over, there were 91.6 males.

The median income for a household in the borough was $49,063, and the median income for a family was $52,578. Males had a median income of $31,736 versus $24,083 for females. The per capita income for the borough was $17,246. About 1.6% of families and 2.4% of the population were below the poverty line, including 0.8% of those under age 18 and 1.7% of those age 65 or over.

In 2010 Abbottstown had a population of 1,011.  The racial and ethnic composition of the population was 88.4% non-Hispanic white, 1.4% black or African American, 0.1% Native American, 1.0% Asian, 1.2% reporting two or more races and 9.4% Hispanic or Latino.

Notable person
 Henry Louis Baugher, born in Abbottstown, Lutheran preacher, and president of Gettysburg College

References

External links

 Borough of Abbottstown official website

1753 establishments in Pennsylvania
Boroughs in Adams County, Pennsylvania
Boroughs in Pennsylvania
Populated places established in 1753